In analytic number theory, the Petersson trace formula is a kind of orthogonality relation between coefficients of a holomorphic modular form. It is a specialization of the more general Kuznetsov trace formula.

In its simplest form the Petersson trace formula is as follows. Then for any positive integers  we have

References 

 Henryk Iwaniec: Topics in Classical Automorphic Forms.  Graduate Studies in Mathematics 17, American Mathematics Society, Providence, RI, 1991.

Theorems in analytic number theory